Miss 420 is a 1998 Bollywood Romantic thriller film directed by Akashdeep Sabir and starring Sheeba Akashdeep in the title role alongside Baba Sehgal, Shakti Kapoor, Aashif Sheikh, Mohan Joshi and Tinnu Anand. Popular rapper Baba Sehgal made his acting debut with this film. The soundtrack of the movie was composed by Anu Malik, and four songs were sung by Baba Sehgal. The soundtrack of the film was released in 1994 and was extremely popular with hits like "Aaja Meri Gaadi Mein Baith Ja" And Memsaab O Memsaab. However, the film was delayed for several years and was released in 1998.

Cast
Baba Sehgal as Vicky / Mr  421
Sheeba Akashdeep as  Miss Mohini  Anamika / Shikha Sharma Shraddha Kapoor  CBI Anamika Father  / MISS 420
Shakti Kapoor as CBI Officer
Aasif Sheikh as Arvind (Anamika Brother)
Tinnu Anand as Khan / Mr Aluwalia
Johnny Lever as Tony Fernandes
Mohan Joshi as Diwan Kapoor (DK)
Amita Nangia Fake MISS 420 / Sheena

Music
"Aaja Meri Gaadi Me Baith Ja" -  Baba Sehgal, Anu Malik
"O Baba Kiss Me" - Alisha Chinai, Ravindra
"Ha Kah De Ya Na Keh De" - Baba Sehgal, Alisha Chinai
"Memsaab O Memsaab" (part 1) - Baba Sehgal, Sheeba Akashdeep
"Mere Dil Mein Rehte Ho" - Kumar Sanu
"Dhak Dhak Ye Dil Dhadke" - Baba Sehgal
"Memsaab O Memsaab" (part 2) - Anu Malik, Sheeba
Jhoom Jhoom Re Baba Jhoom" - Hema Sardesai  
 "O Baba Kiss me" was reused in the Telugu film by composer M.M.Keeravani in the filmS.P.Parashuram starring Chiranjeevi

External links
 Miss 420 at the Internet Movie Database

1990s Hindi-language films
Indian action thriller films
Indian romantic thriller films
1998 action thriller films
1998 films
1990s romantic thriller films
Films scored by Anu Malik